Rupee is a variety of currency units used in several economies.

Rupee or rupia may also refer to:

Present currencies 
 Indian rupee
 Sri Lankan rupee
 Mauritian rupee
 Nepalese rupee
 Pakistani rupee
 Seychellois rupee

Former (obsolete) currencies
Afghan rupee
Bhutanese rupee
Burmese rupee
Danish Indian rupee
East African rupee
French Indian rupee
Gulf rupee
Hyderabadi rupee
Italian Somaliland rupia
Javan rupee
Portuguese Indian rúpia
Travancore rupee
Zanzibari rupee

Other uses
Rupee (musician), a soca musician from Barbados
Rupee (The Legend of Zelda), a fictional currency in The Legend of Zelda

See also 
 Bangladeshi taka
 Bhutanese ngultrum, pegged to the Indian rupee
 German East African rupie
 History of the rupee
 Indonesian rupiah
 Maldivian rufiyaa
 Netherlands Indian roepiah
 Riau rupiah
 West Irian rupiah